Brenell Engineering Ltd. was a British company in operation from 1947 to 1984 who manufactured audio electronics, in particular professional quality reel-to-reel tape decks.

History
The company was founded in 1947 by Robert Hahn and Peter Glazer, as a small precision engineering company based in Northington Street, Clerkenwell. In 1953, the company produced its first tape recorder, a "do-it-yourself" unit marketed under the Soundesign name. Brenell became a leading manufacturer of tape decks, including multi-track studio machines.

After a series of financial setbacks, the company was formally dissolved in January 1984.

All of The Beatles had Brenell tape recorders installed in their homes. These were used to make tape loops and other recordings that eventually found their way onto several Beatles recordings, such as "Tomorrow Never Knows".

Other users include Darren Allison, producer of The Divine Comedy and Spiritualized.

References 

Brenelltape.co.uk - Web site giving historical overview of Brenell and Soundcraft products

Manufacturers of professional audio equipment
Audio equipment manufacturers of the United Kingdom
Defunct manufacturing companies of England
Electronics industry in London
Manufacturing companies based in London
1947 establishments in England
1984 disestablishments in England
British companies disestablished in 1984
British companies established in 1947